transition was an experimental literary journal that featured surrealist, expressionist, and Dada art and artists. It was founded in 1927 by Maria McDonald and her husband Eugene Jolas and published in Paris. They were later assisted by editors Elliot Paul (April 1927 – March 1928), Robert Sage (October 1927 – Fall 1928), and James Johnson Sweeney (June 1936 – May 1938).

Origins
The literary journal was intended as an outlet for experimental writing and featured modernist, surrealist and other linguistically innovative writing and also contributions by visual artists, critics, and political activists. It ran until spring 1938. A total of 27 issues were produced. It was distributed primarily through Shakespeare and Company, the Paris bookstore run by Sylvia Beach.

While it originally almost exclusively featured poetic experimentalists, it later accepted contributions from sculptors, civil rights activists, carvers, critics, and cartoonists. Editors who joined the journal later on were Stuart Gilbert, Caresse Crosby and Harry Crosby. Maeve Sage acted as secretary for the magazine during a portion of its Paris-based run.

Purpose

Published quarterly, transition also featured Surrealist, Expressionist, and Dada art. In an introduction to the first issue, Eugene Jolas wrote:

Manifesto

The journal gained notoriety in 1929 when Jolas issued a manifesto about writing. He personally asked writers to sign "The Revolution of the Word Proclamation" which appeared in issue 16/17 of transition. It began:

The Proclamation was signed by Kay Boyle, Whit Burnett, Hart Crane, Caresse Crosby, Harry Crosby, Martha Foley, Stuart Gilbert, A. Lincoln Gillespie, Leigh Hoffman, Eugene Jolas, Elliot Paul, Douglas Rigby, Theo Rutra, Robert Sage, Harold J. Salemson, and Laurence Vail.

Featured writers
Transition stories, a 1929 selection by E. Jolas and R. Sage from the first thirteen numbers featured: Gottfried Benn, Kay Boyle (Polar Bears and Others), Robert M. Coates (Conversations No. 7), Emily Holmes Coleman (The Wren's Nest), Robert Desnos, William Closson Emory (Love in the West), Léon-Paul Fargue, Konstantin Fedin, Murray Goodwin, (A Day in the Life of a Robot), Leigh Hoffman (Catastrophe), Eugene Jolas (Walk through Cosmopolis), Matthew Josephson (Lionel and Camilla), James Joyce (A Muster from Work in Progress), Franz Kafka (The Sentence), Vladimir Lidin, Ralph Manheim (Lustgarten and Christkind), Peter Negoe (Kaleidoscope), Elliot Paul (States of Sea), Georges Ribemont-Dessaignes, Robert Sage (Spectral Moorings), Kurt Schwitters (Revolution), Philippe Soupault, Gertrude Stein (As a Wife Has a Cow a Love Story).

Some other artists, authors and works published in transition included Samuel Beckett (Assumption, For Future Reference), Kay Boyle (Dedicated to Guy Urquhart), H. D. (Gift, Psyche, Dream, No, Socratic), Max Ernst (Jeune Filles en des Belles Poses, The Virgin Corrects the Child Jesus before Three Witnesses), Stuart Gilbert (The Aeolus Episode in Ulysses, Function of Words, Joyce Thesaurus Minusculus), Juan Gris (Still Life), Ernest Hemingway (Three Stories, Hills like White Elephants), Franz Kafka (The Metamorphosis), Alfred Kreymborg (from: Manhattan Anthology), Pablo Picasso (Petite Fille Lisant), Muriel Rukeyser (Lover as Fox), Gertrude Stein (An Elucidation, The Life and Death of Juan Gris, Tender Buttons, Made a Mile Away), William Carlos Williams (The Dead Baby, The Somnambulists, A Note on the Recent Work of James Joyce, Winter, Improvisations, A Voyage to Paraguay).

Also Paul Bowles, Bob Brown,  Kathleen Cannell, Malcolm Cowley, Hart Crane, Abraham Lincoln Gillespie Jr. (on music), Eugene Jolas (also as Theo Rutra), Marius Lyle, Robert McAlmon, Archibald McLeish Allen Tate; Bryher, Morley Callaghan, Rhys Davies, Robert Graves, Sidney Hunt, Robie Macauley, Laura Riding, Ronald Symond, Dylan Thomas.

Christian Zervos' article Picasso à Dinard was featured in the Spring  1928 issue. No. 26, 1937, with a Marcel Duchamp cover, featured Hans Arp, Man Ray, Fernand Léger, László Moholy-Nagy, Piet Mondrian, Alexander Calder and others.

A third to half the space in the early years of transition was given to translations, some of which done by Maria McDonald Jolas; French writers included: André Breton, André Gide and the Peruvian Victor Llona ; German and Austrian poets and writers included Hugo Ball, Carl Einstein, Yvan Goll, Rainer Maria Rilke, René Schickele, August Stramm, Georg Trakl; Bulgarian, Czech, Hungarian, Italian, Polish, Russian, Serbian, Swedish, Yiddish, and Native American texts were also translated.

Perhaps the most famous work to appear in transition was Finnegans Wake, by James Joyce. Many segments of the unfinished novel were published under the name of Work in Progress.

Featured artists 
While transition was foremost a literary review, it also featured avant-garde visual art beginning with its inaugural issue (April 1927), which included reproductions of paintings by Max Ernst, Lajos Tihanyi, and Pavel Tchelitchew. While the periodical's cover initially bore only textual elements, commencing with the thirteenth issue Jolas began to feature art on the outside of his publication as well–much of it created specifically for transition. In the order of their appearance, the magazine's covers included art by Pablo Picasso, Stuart Davis, Man Ray, Gretchen Powel, Kurt Schwitters, Eli Lotar, Jean Arp, Sophie Taeuber-Arp, Paul Klee, Fernand Léger, Joan Miró, Marcel Duchamp, and Wassily Kandinsky. In his essay "Fontierless Decade," in the magazine's final issue, Jolas reflected that “all the new painters, photographers, and sculptors were reproduced [in transition], beginning in 1927, when many of them were unknown outside of a small circle on the continent.” While Jolas's program for his magazine was outwardly focused on literature, his comments in his essay "A New Vocabulary" indicate that he considered visual art's inventiveness to be a model for the possibilities of the poetic word. He wrote, “While painting . . .  has proceeded to rid itself of the descriptive, done away with classical perspective, has tried more and more to attain a purity of abstract idealism, should the art of the word remain static?” Much of the visual art in transition belongs to a small number of avant-garde moments that later became a part of the Modernist canon, especially (but not exclusively) Dada, Surrealism, Cubism, and Constructivism. Other artistic selections, like the reproduction of Marie Monnier's embroidery Birth, in transition no. 4, highlight Jolas's interest in both new and re-invented means of expression as well as marking the milieu in which he and his co-editors worked and socialized. For instance, Jolas knew Marie Monnier's sister, Adrienne Monnier, proprietor of the bookstore La Maison des Amis des Livres, where Marie's work was exhibited in 1927. Moreover, the writer Léon-Paul Fargue, who Jolas admired and included in his magazine, wrote text the catalog to the 1927 exhibition of Marie Monnier's embroidery. Similarly, Jolas obtained a number of the reproductions of Surrealist paintings and objects that appeared in the magazine's first two years–including work by Yves Tanguy, who was little known at the time–by way of his friend Marcel Noll, who was director of the Galerie Surréaliste until it closed in 1928. Transition, in turn, ran advertisements for the gallery in several issues.

See also
List of literary magazines

References

Further reading
 McMillan, Dougald. transition: The History of a Literary Era 1927–38. New York: George Brazillier, 1976.
 Hoffman, Frederick J. The Little Magazine: a History and a Bibliography. Princeton: Princeton University Press, 1947.
 IN transition: A Paris anthology. Writing and art from transition magazine 1927–1930. With an introduction by Noel Riley Fitch. New York, London, Toronto, Sydney, Auckland: Anchor Books, Doubleday, 1990.
 Jolas, Eugene. Man from Babel. Ed. Andreas Kramer and Rainer Rumold. New Haven: Yale University Press, 1998.
 Mansanti, Céline. La revue transition (1927–1938): le modernisme historique en devenir. Rennes, France: Presses Universitaires de Rennes, 2009.
Nelson, Cary. Repression and Recovery: Modern American Poetry and the Politics of Cultural Memory, 1910–1945. Madison: University of Wisconsin Press, 1989.
 Transition Stories, Twenty-three Stories from transition. Ed. Eugene Jolas and Robert Sage. New York: W. V. McKee, 1929.

External links
transition  Davidson College, Davidson, North Carolina. Retrieved October 5, 2005.
transition partial magazine scans (1927-1930 and 1938) at Gallica 
1927 establishments in France
1938 disestablishments in France
Defunct literary magazines published in Europe
Defunct magazines published in France
Magazines established in 1927
Magazines disestablished in 1938
Magazines published in Paris
Monthly magazines published in France
Quarterly magazines published in France